The Eastern Africa Power Pool (EAPP), is a collaborative effort by eleven countries in Eastern Africa to interconnect their electricity grids and take advantage of excess capacity within the network and facilitate trade of electric power between the members.

Location
The secretariat of the Eastern Africa Power Pool organisation is located at Wereda 02, House 059, Bole Sub City, in Addis Ababa, the capital and largest city of Ethiopia.

History
In February 2005, seven countries in the Eastern African region came together because they saw mutual benefit in having one power pool. The original countries were, Burundi, Democratic Republic of the Congo, Egypt, Ethiopia, Kenya, Rwanda, and Sudan. Later, Tanzania (2010), Libya (2011), Djibouti and Uganda (2012) joined the pool.

The objectives of the Eastern Africa Power Pool include (a) the reduction of power costs within the region (b) facilitation of power trade between the members (c) increasing energy availability to citizens of member countries (d) increase the grid security of the member countries.

As a prerequisite to the success of these efforts, power grid interconnections between the member countries need to be established. Such interconnections include the interconnection between Ethiopia and Kenya via the Sodo–Moyale–Suswa High Voltage Power Line

Other such linkages are the Bujagali–Tororo–Lessos High Voltage Power Line, between Uganda and Kenya, the Isinya–Singida High Voltage Power Line, between Kenya and Tanzania, the Kawanda–Birembo High Voltage Power Line, between Uganda and Rwanda, the Nkenda–Mpondwe–Beni High Voltage Power Line, between Uganda and the Democratic Republic of the Congo. and the Karuma–Juba High Voltage Power Line between Uganda and South Sudan. In 2022, construction work began on the Kigoma–Butare–Ngozi–Gitega High Voltage Power Line to connect the electricity grid of Rwanda and Burundi.

Pool capacity
The table below, outlines the installed capacity, peak demand and the excess capacity or deficit for each of the eleven countries in the Eastern Africa Power Pool, as of June 2019.

Member utility companies
The member countries of the Eastern Africa Power Pool and their respective electricity utility companies are listed in the table below.

Transactions
Some of the transactions among EAPP member states include the following: In July 2022, Kenya signed a 25-year power purchase agreement with Ethiopia, where the latter will sell 200 MW of electric power to the former starting 1 November 2022 for the first three years. Thereafter the amount sold will increase to 400 MW for the remaining 22 year of the contract.

See also
 Southern African Power Pool
 Central African Power Pool
 West African Power Pool
 North African Power Pool

References

External links
 East African Countries Will Have Electricity They Cannot Use, Unless They Focus on Their Transmission Infrastructure Now As at 28 June 2018.
Sustainable Electricity Pricing for Tanzania

Energy in Africa
Electricity markets
Organizations established in 2005
2005 establishments in Ethiopia